The 2008 Saskatchewan Roughriders finished in 2nd place in the West Division with a 12–6 record for the second consecutive year. It was their 51st season in the Canadian Football League. The Roughriders attempted to repeat as Grey Cup champions, but, due to an abundance of injuries, lost to the BC Lions in the West Semi-Final game.

Off-season
Several months after capturing the 2007 Grey Cup, 2007 CFL coach of the Year Kent Austin stepped down as head coach to become the offensive co-ordinator at Ole Miss. In accepting this position in the NCAA, Austin turned down a very lucrative contract that the Riders had offered. On February 6, 2008, Eric Tillman announced that the new head coach would be Ken Miller.  Miller was formerly an offensive coordinator under Austin.

Last season's starting quarterback Kerry Joseph was traded to the Toronto Argonauts on March 5, 2008, along with a third round pick in the 2010 CFL Draft in exchange for offensive tackle Glenn January, defensive lineman Ronald Flemons, the Argos' first-round pick in the 2008 CFL Draft and a 2010 second-round selection.

On April 5, 2008 a report was released saying that the Roughriders set a new record for earnings in a single season.  At the Roughriders' annual general meeting, Mike Back, the club's vice-president of finance and operations, reported the Roughriders registered a record profit of $1,737,377 in 2007.
The Roughriders exceeded the $22 million plateau in total operating revenue and expenditures. This figure eclipsed the previous mark of $15 million. Total net assets increased by $1,998,857 to $5,096,393.  These earnings were due in part to the championship season the Roughriders sported, which included 8 home game sellouts and their first home playoff game in 19 years.

CFL draft

Pre-season

Regular season

Crowd trouble

On September 20, an unsportsmanlike incident occurred during a game in Saskatchewan. It started in the fourth quarter when Saskatchewan fans became angry about a B.C. play they thought should have been a face mask penalty. Lions defensive back Dante Marsh fired the ball into the stands, and Saskatchewan fans responded by pelting the Lions with full cans of beer. The incident occurred on the night when the Roughriders were honouring past CFL legend Ron Lancaster, who recently died at the age of 69.  The club subsequently announced that in order to reduce the probability of a similar incident beer in the east stands (where the visitors bench is) would be sold in plastic cups for at least the remainder of the season.

Ron Lancaster
On Thursday, September 18, Ron Lancaster, 69, died from an apparent heart attack, less than two months after being diagnosed with lung cancer.
The former Saskatchewan Roughriders quarterback, also had a long career as a head coach, with the Edmonton Eskimos and Hamilton Tiger Cats. He was diagnosed in late July and had been undergoing radiation and chemotherapy. Lancaster played 16 seasons with Saskatchewan, and led the team to five Grey Cup appearances. He led the club to their first CFL championship in 1966 when Saskatchewan upset the Ottawa Rough Riders 29–14.
When he retired in 1978, at the age of 41, he was the league's all-time leader in passing yards (50,535), touchdown passes (333), pass attempts (6,223) and completions (3,384). He also suffered more interceptions than any other quarterback in CFL history.  He had also passed for more yards than any passer in professional football history.

Season standings

West

East

Season schedule

Roster

Notable transactions

Player stats

Passing

Rushing

Receiving

Awards and Records
 The Roughriders started the season 6–0 for the first time since 1934.
 Wes Cates, Led CFL, Rushing Touchdowns (12)
 Weston Dressler (SB), Saskatchewan Roughriders – CFL's Most Outstanding Rookie Award
 Jeremy O'Day (C), Saskatchewan Roughriders – Tom Pate Memorial Award

CFL All-Star Selections
 Wes Cates, Running Back
 Gene Makowsky, Offensive Guard
 Anton McKenzie, Linebacker
 Maurice Lloyd, Linebacker

CFL West All-Star Selections
 Wes Cates, Running Back
 Gene Makowsky, Offensive Guard
 Anton McKenzie, Linebacker
 Maurice Lloyd, Linebacker

Playoffs

West Semi-Final
Date and time: Saturday, November 8, 3:30 PM Central Standard TimeVenue: Mosaic Stadium at Taylor Field, Regina, Saskatchewan

References

Saskatchewan Roughriders
Saskatchewan Roughriders seasons